Lucio Maranta or Bishop Luca Maranta (died 1592) was a Roman Catholic prelate who served as Bishop of Montepeloso (1578–1592) and Bishop of Lavello (1561–1578).

Biography
On 31 January 1561, Lucio Maranta was appointed during the papacy of Pope Pius IV as Bishop of Lavello.
On 2 June 1578, he was appointed during the papacy of Pope Gregory XIII as Bishop of Montepeloso.
He served as Bishop of Montepeloso until his death in 1592.

References

External links and additional sources
 (Chronology of Bishops) 
 (Chronology of Bishops) 
 (Chronology of Bishops) 
 (Chronology of Bishops) 

16th-century Italian Roman Catholic bishops
Bishops appointed by Pope Pius IV
Bishops appointed by Pope Gregory XIII
1592 deaths